Daxi may refer to:

Mainland China
Daxi (大西) dynasty, a short-lived dynasty (1643–1646) established by Zhang Xianzhong
Daxi Creek (大溪), tributary of the Xitiao River in Anji County, Zhejiang
Daxi culture (5000 BC–3000 BC), Neolithic culture centered in the Three Gorges region, around the middle Yangtze River
Daxi, Youyang County, town in Youyang Tujia and Miao Autonomous County, Chongqing
Daxi, Pinghe County, town in Pinghe County, Fujian
Daxi, Jiexi County, town in Jiexi County, Guangdong
Daxi, Jianghua Yao County, a town in Jianghua Yao Autonomous County, Hunan
Daxi, Wenling, town in Wenling, Zhejiang
Datong–Xi'an Passenger Railway

Taiwan
Daxi District, district in Taoyuan, Taiwan
Daxi Station, railway station in Yilan County, Taiwan, Republic of China